James Bennett (1775 – 31 March 1855) was an English professional cricketer who made 5 known appearances in first-class cricket matches from 1798 to 1805.  He was a cousin of the more famous John Bennett, not to be confused with John Bennett.

Bennett was mainly associated with Hampshire.

References

1775 births
1855 deaths
English cricketers
English cricketers of 1787 to 1825
Hampshire cricketers
The Bs cricketers
Non-international England cricketers